Island Assembly elections were held in Nevis on 11 July 2011 to elect five members of the Nevis Island Assembly. 

The result was a win for the Nevis Reformation Party (NRP), led by Joseph Parry, which won three of the five seats. The opposition Concerned Citizens' Movement (CCM) won two seats.

Results

By parish

References

Nevis
Nevis
Elections in Saint Kitts and Nevis